The 2002-03 Süper Lig was the 45th edition of top-flight professional football in Turkey. The season celebrated the centenary of Beşiktaş J.K., who became eventual champions. Moreover, Malatyaspor qualified for the first time in a European cup competition after a 2–0 away win at Turkish Cup winners Trabzonspor combined with Fenerbahçe's draw at İzmir with relegated Göztepe, 1–1, despite being ahead in the first half. They are the first team from Eastern Anatolia to play in UEFA competitions.

Locations

Final league table

Results

Top scorers

References
Turkish-Soccer.com by Erdinç Sivritepe

Süper Lig seasons
Turkey
1